Wu Jin-lin (born 6 October 1947) is a Taiwanese politician. He served as the President of the Examination Yuan from 2014 to 2020. He also briefly served as President of the Examination Yuan in 2008.

Education
Wu received his bachelor's and master's degrees in public administration from National Chengchi University.

References

Living people
1947 births
Pingtung County Members of the Legislative Yuan
Members of the 6th Legislative Yuan
Kuomintang Members of the Legislative Yuan in Taiwan
Taiwanese Presidents of the Examination Yuan